Stephen William Need (born 1954) is an Anglican priest and religious author, who was the Dean of St George's College, Jerusalem from 2005 until 2011.

Early life and education
Need was born in Nottingham, England, where he attended Carlton le Willows Grammar School in his early years, and went on to study theology at King's College, London. It was here that he studied for a doctorate in Systematic theology, after completing a Bachelor's degree in theology at the same institution.

St George's College, Jerusalem
Need first joined the staff of St George's College as senior lecturer in 1996 and as a course director from 1999–2001. In March 2008, Need was ordained a priest at the college, where he served as a member of the pastoral sector at the time.

Current placement and future
Need now resides in Chelmsford in the United Kingdom, where he is a priest under the Diocese of Chelmsford at a church in Stock, Essex. He has recently stated that he wishes to pursue further academic studies in the areas of St. Paul and Christianity in Turkey.

Need is also the author of several successful books.

Select bibliography
Truly Divine and Truly Human: The Story of Christ and the Seven Ecumenical Councils (2008)
52 Reflections on Faith for Busy Preachers and Teachers: From the Sinai Summits to the Emmaus Road (2014)

References

Living people
1954 births
People educated at Carlton le Willows Academy
People from Nottingham
Alumni of King's College London
British expatriates in Israel
20th-century English Anglican priests
21st-century English Anglican priests
Christian writers
People from Stock, Essex